The San Diego Skyhawks were a professional ice hockey team in San Diego, California.  They were a member of the Pacific Coast Hockey League from 1948 to 1950.  They played their home games in the Glacier Gardens. They won the 1948-1949 President's Cup.

References

Defunct ice hockey teams in California
Ice hockey teams in San Diego
Ice hockey clubs established in 1948
Ice hockey clubs disestablished in 1950
1948 establishments in California
1950 disestablishments in California